Michael Madsen (born 1957) is an American actor.

Michael Madsen may also refer to:
Michael Madsen (boxer) (born 1958), Danish boxer
Michael Madsen (ice hockey) (born 1980), Danish ice hockey goaltender
Michael Madsen (footballer) (born 1974), Danish football player and manager
Michael Madsen, Danish director of the film Into Eternity and The Visit

See also
 Mick Madsen (1901–1979), Australian rugby league player
 Mads Mikkelsen (b. 1965), Danish actor